Abdelkhalek El-Banna (born 4 July 1988) is an Egyptian competitive rower.

He competed at the 2016 Summer Olympics in Rio de Janeiro, in the men's single sculls, placing in 10th.  He also competed at the 2020 Summer Olympics in Tokyo, finishing 14th in the men's single sculls.

References

External links
 

1988 births
Living people
Egyptian male rowers
Olympic rowers of Egypt
Rowers at the 2016 Summer Olympics
Rowers at the 2020 Summer Olympics
Competitors at the 2019 African Games
African Games silver medalists for Egypt
African Games medalists in rowing
People from Tanta
21st-century Egyptian people